Kabaria is a genus of flies belonging to the family Lesser Dung flies.

Species
K. spinisterna Richards, 1966

References

Sphaeroceridae
Diptera of Africa
Brachycera genera